Raghav Chaitanya is an Indian playback singer who got Filmfare Award for Best Male Playback Singer at 66th Filmfare Awards. He is the youngest artist to win Filmfare Award for Best Male Playback Singer.

References 

Year of birth missing (living people)
Living people
Indian playback singers
Filmfare Awards winners